The Mandarin Oriental, Sanya is a luxury hotel and resort located in Sanya City on the southeastern coast of the island of Hainan, China. The 296-room resort opened in 2009 and is managed by Mandarin Oriental Hotel Group. The hotel contains 10 restaurants and bars as well as the  spa at Mandarin Oriental, Sanya.

Location
Sometimes referred to as "the Chinese Hawaii", this resort area has earned a reputation as a top tourist destination. 

Sanya Phoenix International Airport is reachable from a variety of major domestic cities including Shenzhen, Guangzhou, Beijing, Shanghai, Xian and Kunming, as well as a number of international destinations.

The Hotel

The resort operates 297 guest rooms including a number of duplex villas, each with dedicated butler service and infinity pools.  

There are three pools located at the property, VISTA, ACTIVO and TRANQUILLO offering lap swimming, recreational activities and quietude, respectively.

The Mandarin Oriental, Sanya contains the Spa Village, home to The Spa at Mandarin Oriental, Sanya, and the resident Shaolin kung fu master who teaches t'ai chi to guests in the mornings. Yoga and Qigong classes are also available.  

The hotel features ten restaurants and bars, including a seafood restaurant—Fresh—and MOBlues—a cigar and whiskey lounge.

The Spa
The Spa at Mandarin Oriental, Sanya spans  and features 18 treatment rooms, each with a private steam shower and outdoor bathtub. On premises, a licensed doctor administers traditional Chinese Medicine.

Restaurants & bars
Fresh: a Seafood restaurant with a beachfront location
Pavilion: a poolside restaurant serving Mediterranean- and Asian-inspired menu items
Yi Yang: an upscale restaurant offering a Cantonese menu
Wave: a poolside restaurant and bar
Sunset Bar: a venue for cocktails with views of Coral Bay
Phoenix Tea House: tea lounge serving over 100 varieties of teas
Mee & Mian: a noodle bar located near the beach
MO Blues: a lounge offering a menu of whiskeys, wines and cigars
Breeze: lobby lounge at the Mandarin Oriental, Sanya that serves sweets and a variety of beverages
The Cliff: a private dining location for villa guests

See also
Mandarin Oriental Hotel Group
Mandarin Oriental, Barcelona
Mandarin Oriental, Hong Kong
Mandarin Oriental Hyde Park, London
Mandarin Oriental, Miami
Mandarin Oriental, New York
Mandarin Oriental, Tokyo
Mandarin Oriental, Singapore

References

External links
 Mandarin Oriental, Sanya
 Awards for Mandarin Oriental, Sanya
 Dining at Mandarin Oriental, Sanya
 The Spa at Mandarin Oriental, Sanya
 Mandarin Oriental, Sanya on Facebook
 Mandarin Oriental, Sanya on Flickr

Mandarin Oriental Hotel Group
Hotels in Hainan
Hotels established in 2009
Hotel buildings completed in 2009
Sanya